European route E 714 is a European B class road in France, connecting the cities Orange — Marseille.

Route 
 
 E15 Orange
 E712 Marseille

External links 
 UN Economic Commission for Europe: Overall Map of E-road Network (2007)
 International E-road network

International E-road network
Roads in France